The African U-20 Women's World Cup qualification is an association football tournament for the under 20 teams, that is held every two years, and serves as a qualifying tournament for the FIFA U-20 Women's World Cup.

In the first two editions in 2002 and 2004 only one team qualified for the World Cup, thus a final was played. From 2006 onwards the confederation was granted a second spot, so all following tournaments were played in a knock-out format only to the semi finals. All matches are played on a home and away system, there is no host country for the single years.

Results

African U-19 Women's Championship
Only the winner qualified for the World Cup in the first two editions.

African U-20 Women's World Cup qualifying tournament
Two teams qualify for the World Cup. No final match is played.

FIFA World Cup qualification and results
Three different teams have qualified for the FIFA U-20 Women's World Cup. Nigeria has been the only team to reach the quarter-finals at the World Cup, placing 2nd twice in 2010 and 2014 and 4th in 2012. All other CAF teams have been eliminated in the group stages.

Legend

Teams participating 

Legend

 — Champions
 — Runners-up
 — Third place
 — Fourth place
 — Semifinal
QF — Quarterfinal
 — Qualified for FIFA WC
PR — Preliminary Round

R1 — Round 1
R2 — Round 2
R3 — Round 3
 — Withdrew
 — Did not enter
 — Hosts
q — Qualified for upcoming tournament

See also 
Africa Women Cup of Nations
African U-17 Cup of Nations for Women

References

External links 
 Official website
 African Women U-20 World Cup Qualifying – rsssf.com

 
Confederation of African Football competitions for women's national teams
Recurring sporting events established in 2002
Under-20 association football